Gniew (pronounced  ; , or Gniéw; formerly ) is a historic town situated on the left bank of the Vistula River, in the Pomeranian Voivodeship, in northern Poland. It has 6,870 inhabitants (2016). It is one of the oldest towns in Eastern Pomerania, and is renowned for its medieval brick gothic Castle, which has become one of the region's most recognizable monuments.

History
The first recorded mentions of Gniew appear in written documents of the first half of the 13th century,  which refer to the region as Terra Gymeu (Gmewan, Gimen, Gymen) in 1229, terra Mewe in 1250, and terra Gemewe in 1283, terra Mewa. The name Gniew is of native, Polish origin. The name Wansca (Wońsk) was also used. The German name of Mewe is a Germanized form of the Polish name Gmewe. The town's coat of arms is an example of canting, as it depicts a seagull (German: Möwe), which alludes to the town's Germanized name.

Beginning in the 10th century, the region belonged to Poland and was part of Gdańsk Pomerania. After the division of Poland by Bolesław III Wrymouth, Gniew fell to the castellany of Starogard Gdański. The land later fell to the Dukes of Świecie and in 1229 Duke Sambor and Swietopelk II of Pomerania granted it to the Cistercian abbey in Oliwa. In the second half of the 13th century, Sambor retook Gniew from the Cistercians and in 1276 bestowed it on the Teutonic Knights. Their claim was formally recognized by Mestwin II of Pomerania in 1282, and the city became the first stronghold of the Teutonic Order on the left riverside of the Vistula. A castle was built as a result of this important strategic location, and in 1297 the Teutonic Knights gave Gniew town privileges. In 1306, the town returned to Poland, and several years later it was occupied by Teutonic Knights.

The town changed hands various times between 1410 and 1466. In 1440, it joined the anti-Teutonic Prussian Confederation, and upon its request it was re-incorporated to Poland by King Casimir IV Jagiellon in 1454, which was confirmed in the Second Peace of Toruń in 1466. Administratively, it was part of the Pomeranian Voivodeship in the Polish province of Royal Prussia, later also in the Greater Poland Province. Gniew was the seat of the starosts (local district governors), they resided in the Gniew castle. In 1454 Gniew was temporarily the first seat of the Polish voivodes of Pomerania. In 1626, during the Swedish-Polish War, a battle between the Polish–Lithuanian Commonwealth and Swedish forces was fought in the area of Gniew, resulting in a (formal) victory for the army of King Gustavus Adolphus of Sweden, though the battle was unresolved. 

In the second half of the 17th century, prior to becoming King of Poland, John III Sobieski served as the starost of Gniew and built the "Marysieńka Palace" for his wife, Queen Marie Casimire.

Gniew was annexed by the Kingdom of Prussia during the Partitions of Poland and became part of the German Empire in 1871. During the Napoleonic Wars, General Jan Henryk Dąbrowski spent four months in Gniew on medical treatment. In November 1831, several Polish cavalry units of the November Uprising stopped near the town on the way to their internment places. During the partition period, the population was subjected to Germanisation policies, however, the population was subjected to Germanisation policies, however, Gniew was a strong Polish pro-independence centre. Polish organisations were established and operated here, demonstrations were held and volunteers were secretly recruited for the January Uprising in the Russian Partition. In 1906–1907, local Polish children joined the children school strikes against Germanisation that spread throughout the Prussian Partition of Poland. With the defeat of Imperial Germany in World War I, Gniew became part of restored Poland according to the Treaty of Versailles. This date is celebrated in Gniew till today as the anniversary of liberation from Prussian oppression and the end of 148 years of attempts to eradicate its Polish past.

After the First World War, the number of ethnic Germans in the town decreased. During the first few months of World War II and the German occupation of Poland many of the Polish residents of Gniew and the surrounding area were killed by Germans in the nearby Forest of Szpęgawsk. Gniew castle was used by Nazi Germany as a prison for the ethnically cleansed Polish population of Tczew and the surrounding area. In November 1939, the Germans carried out the first expulsions of some 600 Poles from Gniew.

Main sights

The most notable landmark of the town is the Ordensburg castle built by the Teutonic Order at the turn of the 14th century, which later served as the seat of the local starosts, as well as Marysienka's Palace, built during the second half of the 17th century. The town also boasts a well preserved medieval old town, with buildings dating from the 15th to 19th century and a Gothic church dating to the 14th century.

Notable people 
 Iwan Knorr (1853–1916), German composer and teacher of music
 Grzegorz Bonin (born 1983), Polish footballer

International relations

Gniew is twinned with:

References

External links

 Municipal website   
 Homepage of the Zamek Gniew Hotel in Gniew Castle

Cities and towns in Pomeranian Voivodeship
Tczew County
Pomeranian Voivodeship (1919–1939)
Populated places on the Vistula